Samuli "Skrymer" Ponsimaa is the guitarist in  Folk Metal band Finntroll. He is also an artist, and has designed all of the artwork for Finntroll, such as Cover and Booklets, Stage Scenery and Outfits,  Merchandise and more. He has an artwork profile on Facebook and he also work as a tattoo artist at Inkquisition tattoos in Essen. 
He plays Gibson Guitars. Mostly the Gibson flying v. 
In 2009 he and fellow Finntroll member Mathias Lillmåns formed the Death Metal band Decomposter, in which he plays the guitar.

References

Living people
Finnish heavy metal guitarists
Finntroll members
1977 births
21st-century guitarists